is a Japanese sprint canoer who competed from the mid-1960s to the early 1970s. He was eliminated in the repechages of the K-4 1000 m event at the 1964 Summer Olympics in Tokyo. Eight years later in Munich, Sato was eliminated in the repechages of the K-1 1000 m event.

External links
Sports-reference.com profile

1941 births
Canoeists at the 1964 Summer Olympics
Canoeists at the 1972 Summer Olympics
Japanese male canoeists
Living people
Olympic canoeists of Japan